Things We Read (TWR) was a charity and military service organization that promoted reading by collecting book recommendations from influential citizens and donating books to members of the armed forces and local communities. It operated as a nonprofit 501(C)(3) organization.

About

Things We Read was started in 2011 by two US Army officers serving in Iraq during Operation New Dawn. Co-founders Chris Molaro and Garrison Haning wanted to establish constructive ways for soldiers to spend their free time. During deployment, they noticed that too many soldiers occupied their off-time by playing video games. Soldiers weren't taking productive breaks from the stresses of war. The two officers started collecting book lists from respected leaders in their unit to distribute to soldiers.

When Molaro and Haning returned from Iraq, they decided to form a non-profit that would leverage the power of book recommendations to inspire soldiers to read. Things We Read collects and aggregates book recommendations from military commanders, business leaders, politicians, musicians, athletes, actors, and authors. The organization donates books from its reading lists to soldiers and local communities.

Book list contributors
Jeff Arnett
Senator Mark Begich
Mayim Bialik
LeVar Burton
Lt. General Robert Caslen
Thurston Clark
Max Collins
Anderson Cooper
Joe Cross
Mark Cuban
Landon Donovan
Mike Erwin
Joseph Galloway
Bill Gates
Malcolm Gladwell
Alex Gorsky
US Secretary of Defense Chuck Hagel
LeBron James
Dr. Paul Jaminet
Coach K
Dr. Douglas Merrill
Wes Moore
Bill Murray
Elon Musk
Governor Martin O'Malley
John Ondrasik (Five for Fighting)
Nick Padlo
Mike Rowe
Mark Sisson
Dr. Tommy Sowers
Admiral James Stavridis
Maj. General William Suter
Representative Chris Van Hollen
Dan Wilbur

References

External links

2011 establishments in the United States
501(c)(3) organizations
American veterans' organizations
Military-related organizations
United States military support organizations